The Friedrich-August Cross was a German decoration of the First World War. It was set up on 24 September 1914 by Frederick Augustus II, Grand Duke of Oldenburg, with two classes, for (to quote its citation) "all persons of military or civilian status, who have shown outstanding service during the war itself".

Insignia
The Friedrich-August-Kreuz is a black iron cross pattée with a laurel wreath between the arms.  The obverse of the cross bears a circular central medallion with the initials FA.  The crown of Oldenburg appears on the upper arm of the cross, with the lower arm bearing the date 1914.  The reverse is plain.

Recipients

First Class 

 Prince Adalbert of Prussia (1884–1948)
 Conrad Albrecht
 Joachim von Amsberg (general)
 Hermann Bauer
 Paul Behncke
 Theobald von Bethmann Hollweg
 Johannes Blaskowitz
 Werner von Blomberg
 Friedrich Boedicker
 Walter Böning
 Walter Braemer
 Karl-Heinrich Brenner
 Eduard von Capelle
 Prince Eitel Friedrich of Prussia
 Archduke Eugen of Austria
 Alexander von Falkenhausen
 Kurt Fricke
 Hermann Geyer
 Leo Geyr von Schweppenburg
 Hermann von Hanneken (soldier)
 Heino von Heimburg
 Wilhelm Heye
 Paul von Hindenburg
 Franz von Hipper
 Henning von Holtzendorff
 Gerhard Kauffmann
 Wilhelm Keitel
 Werner Kempf
 Gustav Kieseritzky
 Philipp Kleffel
 Gustav Leffers
 Felix von Luckner
 Günther Lütjens
 Georg Alexander von Müller
 Karl August Nerger
 Erich Raeder
 Ludwig von Reuter
 Ehrhard Schmidt
 Hubert Schmundt
 Otto Schniewind
 Otto Schultze
 Hans von Seeckt
 Otto von Stülpnagel
 Karl Topp
 Adolf von Trotha
 Walter Warzecha
 Wilhelm II, German Emperor
 Karl Witzell
 Eberhard Wolfram

Second Class 

 Ludwig Bieringer
 Hellmuth Heye
 Ernst Lindemann

References

Bibliography 
 Friedhelm Beyreiß: Der Hausorden und die tragbaren Ehrenzeichen des Großherzogtum Oldenburg 1813-1918, Militair-Verlag Klaus D. Patzwall, Norderstedt 1997, 

Military awards and decorations of Imperial Germany
Orders, decorations, and medals of Oldenburg
Awards established in 1914